Markt Indersdorf station is a railway station in the Karpfhofen district in the municipality of Markt Indersdorf, located in the district of Dachau in Upper Bavaria, Germany.

References

External links

Munich S-Bahn stations
Railway stations in Bavaria
Railway stations in Germany opened in 1912
Buildings and structures in Dachau (district)